Maryam Mursal (born 1 January 1950) is a Somali composer and vocalist.

Biography
Mursal grew up in Somalia in a Muslim family with four daughters. Mursal's family was originally from Somaliland, and is from the Madhibaan clan.

As a teenager, she broke with tradition and began singing professionally in Mogadishu. She performed in nightclubs and her brand of music, featuring a mix of blues, soul, Somali and Arabic influences, and known as Somali jazz, became popular across the country. Performing primarily solo, she also collaborated with Waaberi, a 300-member music and dance troupe associated with the Somali National Theatre. Later, after having criticized Somalia's then ruling military government, she was banned from singing for two years, and made her living driving a taxi.

During the subsequent civil war in her homeland, Mursal and her five children moved to neighboring Djibouti, where she found asylum in the Danish embassy. It was this odyssey that provided the gem of her solo recording The Journey, with guitars, sequencers and back-up vocals from Peter Gabriel.

Mursal still lives abroad, now residing in UK. She has toured Europe with Waaberi and appeared with Nina Simone. Her work has been produced by Peter Gabriel's Real World record label.

Discography
 New Dawn album
 The Journey
 ''Indho caashaq (love eyes)
 1964 first song

Quotes
"Traditional music is very important to me but I was also listening to people like Ray Charles, The Beatles, everything."
"We as artists are responsible if something wrong is taking place in our society. It's very important for us to speak up, even though we may have to do it with a double tongue. We have to speak out for our people."
"I was always the first woman. I was the first woman singing Somali jazz, I was the first star, and I was the first to drive a taxi! I was the first to drive a lorry, and now I'm the first woman from Somalia to have an international record."

See also
Waaberi
Radio Mogadishu
Radio Hargeisa
Music of Somalia
Abdullahi Qarshe
Mohamed Sulayman Tubeec
Mohamed Mooge Liibaan

References

External links
 Maryam Mursal Songs
 The Journey: Maryam Mursal
 Interview with Maryam Mursal on FindArticles.com
 Video interview with Maryam Mursal on Freemuse.org

1950 births
Living people
Real World Records artists
20th-century Somalian women singers
Somalian Muslims
21st-century Somalian women singers
Somalian expatriates in the United Kingdom